The Ghost Town & Calico Railway is a  narrow-gauge heritage railroad and amusement park attraction within Knott's Berry Farm, an amusement park located in Buena Park, California.

Origin

Walter Knott began grading and laying a  narrow gauge railroad at his Knotts Berry Farm in 1951. He had acquired a collection of vintage rolling stock and other railroad equipment, and wanted to create a railroad experience to run it on. Service started that November, and the railroad formally opened on January 12, 1952.

The engines and most of the cars came from the Denver & Rio Grande Western Railroad and the Rio Grande Southern Railroad. 

The D&RG painted a narrow-gauge engine and a few narrow-gauge cars, in a color called Rio Grande Gold, for the Chicago Railroad Fair of 1949.  The color was so popular that the company painted the equipment for “The Silverton” (which ran between Durango and Silverton, Colorado) the same color in 1950.  The GT&C rolling stock was painted this color when it commenced operations in 1952.  The engine was fitted with a diamond stack (that was the wrong shaped diamond) and an overly gaudy paint scheme.

In an effort to make it more authentic, the train has since been restored to its appearance in the 1940s.  So, for example, the engines now have a boiler-tube pilot and straight stack.  The passenger cars are painted in Pullman Green (which was mandated by the government when it took over the railroads during World War I).

However, the engines were built in 1881, and the cars are from that time period also.  And, Walter Knott’s objective in creating Ghost Town was to create an Old West town of the 1800s, not the 1940s.

The engines, which were coal-burners, originally had diamond stacks (to catch the coal cinders), a wooden pilot, and a sand dome that was a bit more ornate (see accompanying photos).  The passenger cars have been modified slightly over the years, but they largely retain their original appearance, except for the paint scheme.  They were originally painted in Passenger Car Red, rather than Pullman Green.

Locomotives
The roster includes two C-19  "Consolidation" type steam locomotives built by Baldwin Locomotive Works for the Denver & Rio Grande in 1881.  When retired from service in Colorado, they were D&RGW No. 340 Green River (formerly D&RG #400, named Gold Nugget No. 40 for many years on the GT&C) from the Denver & Rio Grande Western and RGS No. 41 Red Cliff (recently renamed Walter K at the 60th anniversary ceremony January 12, 2012) from the Rio Grande Southern. D&RGW No. 340 was rebuilt in 2016 and is in use, alternating service with RGS No. 41.
 

"Galloping Goose" motor rail buses kept the Rio Grande Southern Railroad viable from the 1930s by carrying mail. Their last use was to scrap their own line in 1953. Knott purchased the RGS Motor #3, which is run on the GT&C during the off-season – when there aren't sufficient passengers to justify hostling a steam locomotive. The Galloping Goose was constructed from a Pierce-Arrow limousine frame, engine, radiator, cowling and body with a four-wheel truck at the front and putting flanged wheels on the rear axle. Later a bogie truck replaced the rear axle, linked to the front truck by a chain drive. A RGS shop-built freight box (converted with trolley seats for passenger service in 1950) articulates on the kingpin over the chain driven center truck. The wooden limousine body was replaced after World War II with a 1939 Wayne military-surplus bus body with both left and right doors. The Pierce-Arrow gasoline engine has been replaced, first with a war-surplus GMC gasoline engine at the RGS, then at Knott's with a war-surplus  6 cylinder in-line  Diamond-Reo gasoline engine. In 1997 the engine was replaced once more with a Cummins Diesel engine supported with an I-beam frame extension salvaged from the demolished Windjammer Surf Racers roller coaster.

In late 1973, the park received ex-D&RGW K-27 #464, a Mikado  locomotive. However, due to clearance issues, in 1981, Knott's donated the locomotive to the Huckleberry Railroad in Flint, Michigan.

Around 2010, Knotts Berry Farm became the home to an H.K. Porter  tank locomotive "Jennie K.". The planned restoration of this locomotive did not happen and it was sold in 2017 to Garner Holt of Garner Holt Productions, who is planning to restore it to operating condition.

Rolling Stock

Revenue
When the route opened on January 12, 1952, for passenger service, the locomotives would haul several yellow vintage closed-vestibule wooden passenger coaches led by a No. 103 parlor car Chama which was converted at Knott's in 1954 to combination baggage/coach Calico with arrows simulating an Indian attack embedded near the baggage door. The arrows have since been removed and the cars have been painted in heritage period Pullman-green livery of D&RGW. The consist also includes a gondola (converted from a flat car for open-air passenger seating), and a stock car which was converted from a gondola, fitted with side benches and a wheelchair lift. Rio Grande Southern 0402 is the only caboose on the railroad and is used today.

Display
The parlor car Durango restored in 2011, the Silverton observation sleeper and the No. B-20 Edna were held with the short way car "bobber" caboose and a wooden box car D&RGW No. 3350, on sidings during normal operation. Nowadays the Silverton has been converted to revenue service as a chair coach, and the caboose serves to embark bandits while in motion.

The Business car B-20 Edna (formerly San Juan) was built for use by the Rio Grande Southern president Otto Mears on sidings and spurs as a portable office and temporary home while making track orders. She is fitted with
 
 An external pantry mounted to the open vestibule and equipped with overhead ice hopper
 galley (kitchen)
 a coal hopper
 water tank
 heating-plant/boiler/stove/oven/warming-tray combination appliance
 multi-use crew dormitory
 lavatory commode with dry bin toilet
 stateroom with large bed, closet, chest of drawers
 a large multipurpose open area convertible to
 office/day-use
 sleeping bunks
 meal service
 et cetera
 conductor's desk near the end window and speedometer
Track inspection as well as observation is facilitated by the open vestibule and enlarged end windows. These were deluxe temporary accommodations compared to a caboose, but it was far less opulent than private varnish of its day, which pales by comparison to the amenities offered aboard today's motor homes and recreational vehicles such as a shower or microwave oven.

See also

Calico, CA
Calico & Odessa Railroad
Cumbres and Toltec Scenic Railroad
Durango and Silverton Narrow Gauge Railroad
List of heritage railroads in the United States
Rail transport in Walt Disney Parks and Resorts

References

External links

D&RGW-related Steam Locomotive Rosters

3 ft gauge railways in the United States
Heritage railroads in California
Knott's Berry Farm
Narrow gauge railroads in California
Railroads of amusement parks in the United States
Transportation in Orange County, California
Tourist attractions in Orange County, California
Western (genre) amusement rides